The History of African Americans in Los Angeles includes the history of African-American participation in the culture, education, and politics of the city of Los Angeles, California.

African Americans in Los Angeles have made countless contributions to the city’s history and culture- particularly in music, dance, visual arts, stage and film. 
African Americans are concentrated in South Los Angeles. There is also a black community in suburban cities such as Compton and Inglewood. Many African Americans have become homeless in the city. The black population in Los Angeles has declined due to gentrification and more Latinos such as Mexicans and Central Americans moving to their neighborhoods.

African Americans make up 8% of the city’s population and 34% of its homeless.

There is also a Louisiana Creole community in Los Angeles. There is an Ethiopian and Eritrean community in Little Ethiopia.

The black population in Los Angeles has been rapidly shrinking due to gentrification and lack of affordable housing. With the rise of Latinos moving into African-American neighborhoods, many African-Americans previously living in  Los Angeles are moving back to the Southern United States.

Spain and Mexico

In 1781, the early non-Indian settlers in Los Angeles included upwards of two dozen Afro-Spanish individuals from the Spanish colonies in California (part of New Spain).

Pío Pico, California's last governor under Mexican rule, was of mixed Spanish, Native American, and African ancestry. Pico spent his last days in Los Angeles, dying in 1894 at the home of his daughter Joaquina Pico Moreno in Los Angeles. He was buried in the old Calvary Cemetery in downtown Los Angeles. His brothers and their descendants were also early influencers in the same era.

Post-Mexico era
Blacks and mulattoes did not face legal discrimination until after California was handed over to the United States in 1848. Many white Southerners who came to California during the Gold Rush brought with them racist attitudes and ideals. In 1850, there were twelve black people registered as residents of Los Angeles. Because many blacks were enslaved until abolition in 1865, few blacks migrated to Los Angeles before then. Due to the construction of the Santa Fe Railroad and a settlement increase in 1880, increasing numbers of blacks came to Los Angeles. By 1900, 2,131 African-Americans, the second largest black population in California, lived in Los Angeles.

In 1872, the First African Methodist Episcopal Church of Los Angeles (First A.M.E. or FAME) was established under the sponsorship of Biddy Mason, an African American nurse and a California real estate entrepreneur and philanthropist, and her son-in-law Charles Owens. The church now has a membership of more than 19,000 individuals.

20th Century
Between the 1890s and 1910, African Americans migrated to Los Angeles from Southern places like Texas, Shreveport, Atlanta and New Orleans to escape the racial violence, racism, white supremacy and bigotry of the Southern United States.

The presence of the Southern Pacific and Transcontinental railroads meant that Los Angeles had a relatively high African-American population for a city in the Western United States; in 1910 it had 7,599 African-Americans. The first branch of the NAACP in California was established in Los Angeles in 1913.

Housing segregation was a common practice in the early 20th century. Many private property deeds explicitly banned owners from selling to anyone but caucasians.

The African-American population did not significantly increase during the first Great Migration. From approximately 1920 to 1955, Central Avenue was the heart of the African-American community in Los Angeles, with active rhythm and blues and jazz music scenes.

Central Avenue had two all-black segregated fire stations. Fire Station No. 30 and Fire Station No. 14 were segregated in 1924.  They remained segregated until 1956 when the Los Angeles Fire Department was integrated. The listing on the National Register notes, "All-black fire stations were simultaneous representations of racial segregation and sources of community pride." In 1928, World War I veteran William J. Powell founded the Bessie Coleman Aero Club.  In 1931, Powell organized the first all-black air show in the United States for the Club in Los Angeles, an event that drew 15,000 visitors. Powell also established a school to train mechanics and pilots.

World War II brought the Second Great Migration, tens of thousands of African American migrants, mostly from Louisiana, Mississippi, Arkansas and Texas, who left segregated Southern states in search of better opportunities in California. The African-American population significantly increased in the Second Great Migration of the 1940s as area factories received labor for the effort in World War II. In 1940 the black population was 63,700.

William Parker became police chief in 1952. He largely refused to hire Black police officers. During most of his tenure, those already on the force were prohibited from having white partners.

The 1965 Watts Riots were triggered by the arrest of a 21-year-old black man named Marquette Frye at 116th Street and Avalon Boulevard for driving drunk. A torrent of built-up rage erupted in the streets of Watts and South Los Angeles. An investigating commission found that the African American citizens had been denied respect and endured substandard housing, education and medical care. The King-Drew Hospital in Willowbrook opened in 1972 as a response to the area having inadequate and insufficient hospital facilities.

In 1972, Wattstax, also known as the "Black-Woodstock," took place in the Los Angeles Memorial Coliseum. Over 100,000 black residents of Los Angeles attended this concert for African American pride. Later, in 1973, a documentary was released about the concert.

In 1973, Tom Bradley was elected as Mayor of Los Angeles, a role he'd hold for 20 years.  L.A.'s first African American mayor, Bradley served over five terms, prior to the establishment of successive term limits, making him the longest-serving mayor of Los Angeles.

In 1991, Rodney King was beaten by police officers. His videotaped beating was controversial, and heightened racial tensions in Los Angeles.

Just 13 days after the videotaped beating of King, a 15-year-old African-American girl named Latasha Harlins was shot and killed by a 51-year-old Korean store owner named Soon Ja Du after being falsely accused of stealing in a store. A jury found Du guilty of voluntary manslaughter, an offense that carries a maximum prison sentence of 16-years. However, trial judge, Joyce Karlin, sentenced Du five years of probation, four hundred hours of community service, and a $500 fine. The lenient response by the courts over the murder was one of the contributing factors to the 1992 Los Angeles riots.

When four Los Angeles Police Department officers were acquitted of charges associated with the beating of Rodney King, the decision led to the 1992 Los Angeles riots.

The trial of the O. J. Simpson murder case took place in 1994.

21st century

In 2004, Singer-songwriter Ray Charles's music studio on Washington Blvd. was declared a historic landmark. He had moved to Los Angeles in 1950.

Geography and population

1950s and 1960s
Philip Garcia, a population specialist and the assistant director of institutional research for California State University, stated that a group of communities in South Los Angeles became African-American by the 1950s and 1960s. These communities were Avalon, Baldwin Hills, Central, Exposition Park, Santa Barbara, South Vermont, Watts, and West Adams. Since then the Santa Barbara street was renamed Martin Luther King Jr. Boulevard. 98,685 blacks moved to Los Angeles in the period 1965 through 1970. During the same period 40,776 blacks moved out.

1970s and 1980s
In 1970, there were 763,000 African-Americans in Los Angeles. They were the second largest minority group after the then estimated 815,000 Mexican-Americans. Los Angeles had the west coast's largest black population. Between 1975 and 1980, 96,833 blacks moved to Los Angeles while 73,316 blacks left Los Angeles. Over 5,000 of the blacks moved to the Riverside-San Bernardino-Ontario area. About 2,000 to 5,000 blacks moved to the Anaheim-Santa Ana-Garden Grove area. James H. Johnson, a University of California-Los Angeles (UCLA) associate professor of geography, stated that due to affordable housing, blacks tend to choose "what is called the balance of the counties" or cities neutral to the existing major cities. In the Inland Empire, blacks tended to move to Rialto instead of Riverside and San Bernardino.

Of the blacks who left the City of Los Angeles between 1975 and 1980 who moved away from the Los Angeles area, over 5,000 moved to the Oakland, California area, about 2,000–5,000 went to San Diego, about 1,000–2,000 went to Sacramento, and about 1,000 to 2,000 went to San Jose, California. About 500 to 1,000 blacks moved to Fresno, Oxnard, Santa Barbara, Simi Valley, and Ventura. Johnson stated that the areas from Fresno to Ventura are "areas that traditionally blacks haven't settled in". Many blacks leaving Los Angeles who also California moved to cities in the U.S. South, including Atlanta, Charlotte, Dallas, Houston, Little Rock, New Orleans, and San Antonio. Other cities receiving LA blacks include Chicago, New York City, and Las Vegas.

1990s
In the late 1990s, many African Americans moved away from the traditional African-Americans neighborhoods, which overall reduced the black population of the City of Los Angeles and Los Angeles County. Many African Americans moved to eastern Los Angeles suburbs in Riverside County and San Bernardino County in the Inland Empire, such as Moreno Valley. From 1980 to 1990 the Inland Empire had the United States's fastest-growing black population. Between the 1980 U.S. Census and the 1990 U.S. Census, the black population increased by 119%. As of 1990 the Inland Empire had 169,128 black people.

Many new African-American businesses appear in the Inland Empire, and many of these businesses have not been previously established elsewhere. The Inland Empire African American Chamber of Commerce began with six members in 1990 and the membership increased to 90 by 1996. According to Denise Hamilton of the Los Angeles Times, as of 1996 "there has been no large-scale migration from the traditional black business districts such as Crenshaw, black business people say." During the 1990s, the black population of the Moreno Valley increased by 27,500, and by 1996 13% of Moreno Valley was African American.

In addition, in the 1990s many African Americans moved to cities and areas in north Los Angeles County such as Palmdale and Lancaster and closer-in cities in Los Angeles County such as Hawthorne and Long Beach. In the 1990s, the black population of Long Beach increased by 66,800.

21st Century

In the 2019 Census, 8% of the Los Angeles County population identified as Black or African-American.

In 2001, within the Los Angeles metropolitan area, Compton, Ladera Heights, and View Park had the highest concentration of blacks. The cities of Malibu and Newport Beach have the lowest concentrations of blacks. As of 2001, in the majority of cities within Los Angeles, Orange, Riverside, San Bernardino, and Ventura counties had black populations below 10%. From 1990 to 2010 the population of Compton, previously African-American, changed to being about 66% Latino and Hispanic.

In the 2000s, new black immigrants from Africa, the Caribbean and the Americas have arrived in Los Angeles. Nigerians, Ethiopians, Ghanaians, Belizeans, Jamaicans, Haitians and Trinidadians are clustered in African-American neighborhoods in Los Angeles.

In 2021, African Americans in Los Angeles County were more at risk for COVID-19.

34% of homeless people in Los Angeles are African Americans despite being only 8% of the population.

Many African Americans in Los Angeles live in poverty.

The black population has declined in Los Angeles due to the huge influx of Mexicans and Central Americans.

In the 2020s, African Americans in Los Angeles had the highest COVID-19 hospitalization rate.

Culture

The Compton Cowboys, a group of horseback riders, does so to avoid harassment from police and gangs and to promote a more positive Compton.

There are black-owned soul food restaurants in Los Angeles. African Americans influenced West Coast hip hop with African American rappers such as Ice Cube and Dr. Dre.

There is an Ethiopian American and Eritrean community in Little Ethiopia, where there are many Ethiopian restaurants serving Ethiopian cuisine.

Islam has had a large influence on the African-American population in California. African-American make up around 15% of mosque attendants in Southern California.

African Americans in Los Angeles have contributed to gangsta rap.

In Los Angeles, there is many graffiti murals dedicated to African Americans such as the Crenshaw Wall.

Gangs and crime
There are many black gangs in Los Angeles. Black gangs emerged in  the late 1940s to the early 1970s. The most notable are Crips and Bloods, both of which trace their origins back to the 1960s.

Notable people

 Jhené Aiko, singer of African American, Japanese, Dominican, Spanish, Native American and German-Jewish descent.
 Yvonne Brathwaite Burke, an attorney from Los Angeles, became the first African American woman in the California Legislature and in 1972 became the first African American woman elected to the U.S. Congress from the West Coast. She served in Congress from 1973 until the end of 1978.
 Doja Cat, South African American musician born and raised in Los Angeles.
 Nat King Cole
 In 1954, Dorothy Dandridge (who was originally from Ohio but settled in Los Angeles) became the first black actress to be nominated for an Academy Award for Best Actress for her performance in the 1954 film Carmen Jones. Many years passed before the entertainment industry acknowledged Dandridge's legacy. Starting in the 1980s, stars such as Cicely Tyson, Jada Pinkett Smith, Halle Berry, Janet Jackson, Whitney Houston, Kimberly Elise, Loretta Devine, Tasha Smith, and Angela Bassett acknowledged Dandridge's contributions to the role of black Americans in film.
 In 1966, Mervyn Dymally, a Los Angeles teacher and politician, became the first African American to serve in the California State Senate. He went on to be elected as Lieutenant Governor in 1974.
 Larry Elder
 In 1993, Etta James was inducted into the Rock and Roll Hall of Fame.  Known as "The Matriarch of R&B", James is regarded as having bridged the gap between rhythm and blues and rock and roll, and is the winner of six Grammys and 17 Blues Music Awards. She was inducted into the Blues Hall of Fame in 2001, and the Grammy Hall of Fame in both 1999 and 2008. James was born the Watts neighborhood of Los Angeles, and received her first professional vocal training at age five from James Earle Hines, musical director of the Echoes of Eden choir, at the St. Paul Baptist Church in South Central.
 In 1981, two years after being drafted into the Los Angeles Lakers, Magic Johnson signed a 25-year, $25-million contract with the Lakers, which was the highest-paying contract in sports history up to that point. Johnson's career was closely followed by the media and he became a favorite among Los Angeles sports fans. Among his many achievements are three NBA MVP Awards, nine NBA Finals appearances, twelve All-Star games, ten All-NBA First and Second Team nominations and he is the NBA's all-time leader in average assists per game, at 11.2. Since his retirement, Johnson has been an advocate for HIV/AIDS prevention and safe sex, as well as an entrepreneur, philanthropist, broadcaster and motivational speaker. Named by Ebony Magazine as one of America's most influential black businessmen in 2009, Johnson has numerous business interests, and was a part-owner of the Lakers for several years. Johnson also is part of a group of investors that purchased the Los Angeles Dodgers in 2012 and the Los Angeles Sparks in 2014.
 In 1988, Florence Griffith Joyner (also known as Flo-Jo), born and raised in Los Angeles, and a UCLA graduate, won three gold medals at the 1988 Olympics in Seoul.  She is considered the fastest woman of all time based on the fact that the world records she set in 1988 for both the 100m and 200m still stand and have yet to be seriously challenged.
 Carl Lewis came to prominence at the 1984 Summer Olympics in Los Angeles, winning four gold medals, matching Jesse Owens’ legendary feat of winning four gold medals at the 1936 Olympics. Lewis was one of the biggest sporting celebrities in the world by the start of 1984, but owing to track and field's relatively low profile in America, Lewis was not nearly as well known there.
 Tim Moore (comedian)
 Nipsey Hussle, rapper of African American and Eritrean descent.
 Regina King
 Charles Mingus, jazz musician, was born in Los Angeles in 1922, raised largely in the Watts area, and recorded in a band in Los Angeles in the 1940s.
 Tavis Smiley
 Maxine Waters
Georgia Ann Robinson was the first black woman to be hired by the LAPD in 1919. She began as a volunteer jail matron, and was later hired as an official policewoman. Robinson worked mainly on juvenile cases and cases involving black women. Robinson often sent the people she came in contact with to social services rather than arresting them, which is considered one of LAPD's early attempts at police reform. She created the Sojourner Truth Home to help black women new to the city, and she volunteered with shelters. Robinson was also a part of the NAACP and worked with H. Claude Hudson to desegregate beaches.
 Tiffany Haddish, actress and comedian of African American and Eritrean descent.

 The Theme Building, an iconic landmark structure at the Los Angeles International Airport, opened. The structure was designed by a team of architects and engineers headed by William Pereira and Charles Luckman, that also included Paul Williams and Welton Becket. Born in Los Angeles in 1894, Williams studied at the Los Angeles School of Art and Design and at the Los Angeles branch of the New York Beaux-Arts Institute of Design Atelier, subsequently working as a landscape architect. He went on to attend the University of Southern California, School of Engineering, designing several residential buildings while still a student there. Williams became a certified architect in 1921, and the first certified African-American architect west of the Mississippi.
 In 2002, Serena Williams, raised in Los Angeles, became the Women's Tennis Association's World No. 1 player. Williams is regarded by some experts and former tennis players to be the greatest female tennis player in history. She has won four Olympic gold medals and is the only female player to have won over $60 million in prize money. Williams is the reigning US Open, WTA Tour Championships and Olympic ladies singles champion.
Tyga, rapper of black and Vietnamese ancestry.
Karrueche Tran, model of African American and Vietnamese descent.
Kofi Siriboe

Lesbian, gay and bisexual

In 2007, 4% of African-American adults in Los Angeles County identified as lesbian, gay, or bisexual.

Most black LGBTQ+ persons live in black neighborhoods. Of black LGB persons, 38% lived in South Los Angeles, 33% lived in the South Bay, and less than 1% lived in the Los Angeles Westside. Mignon R. Moore, the author of "Black and Gay in L.A.: The Relationships Black Lesbians and Gay Men Have to Their Racial and Religious Communities," wrote that black LGB people had a tendency to not have openness about their sexuality and to not discuss their sexuality, and also that "they were not a visible group in neighborhoods like Carson and Ladera Heights".

See also

African Americans in Atlanta
African Americans in New York City
African Americans in Chicago
African Americans in Philadelphia
African Americans in Detroit
African Americans in Baltimore
African Americans in California
African Americans in San Francisco
Blaxican
Romani Gypsies in Los Angeles
Demographics of Los Angeles
Ethnic groups in Los Angeles
History of Central Americans in Los Angeles
History of Mexican Americans in Los Angeles
Little Ethiopia, Los Angeles
Bloods
Crips
Los Angeles Sentinel
California African American Museum
Second Baptist Church (Los Angeles)
Will Smith–Chris Rock slapping incident
The Shifting Grounds of Race
Black Catholicism
Shooting of Ezell Ford
History of Armenian Americans in Los Angeles
History of Chinese Americans in Los Angeles
History of Iranian Americans in Los Angeles
History of the Japanese in Los Angeles
History of the Jews in Los Angeles
History of Palestinians in Los Angeles
Italians in Los Angeles
Cambodians in Los Angeles
Thais in Los Angeles
Filipinos in Los Angeles

Notes

References
 Moore, Mignon R. "Black and Gay in L.A.: The Relationships Black Lesbians and Gay Men Have to Their Racial and Religious Communities" (Chapter 7). In: Hunt, Darnell and Ana-Christina Ramon (editors). Black Los Angeles: American Dreams and Racial Realities. NYU Press, April 19, 2010. , 9780814773062.
 Stanford, Karin L. African Americans in Los Angeles. Arcadia Publishing, 2010. , 9780738580944.

Other reading
 Flamming, Douglas. Bound for Freedom: Black Los Angeles in Jim Crow America (The George Gund Foundation imprint in African American studies). University of California Press, August 1, 2006. , 9780520249905.
 Hunt, Darnell and Ana-Christina Ramón (editors). Black Los Angeles: American Dreams and Racial Realities. NYU Press, April 19, 2010. , 9780814773062.
 Kurashige, Scott. The Shifting Grounds of Race: Black and Japanese Americans in the Making of Multiethnic Los Angeles. Princeton University Press, March 15, 2010. , 9781400834006.
 Pulido, Laura. Black, Brown, Yellow, and Left: Radical Activism in Los Angeles (Volume 19 of American crossroads). University of California Press, January 1, 2006. , 9780520245204.
 Sides, Josh. L.A. City Limits: African American Los Angeles from the Great Depression to the Present. University of California Press, June 1, 2006. , 9780520248304.
 Sonenshein, Raphael. Politics in Black and White: Race and Power in Los Angeles. Princeton University Press, 1993. , 9780691025483.
 Tolbert, Emory J. The UNIA and Black Los Angeles: ideology and community in the American Garvey movement (Volume 3 of A CAAS monograph series, Volume 3 of Afro-American culture and society). Center for Afro-American Studies, University of California, Los Angeles, 1980. , 9780934934046.
 Widener, Daniel. Black Arts West: Culture and Struggle in Postwar Los Angeles. Duke University Press, January 1, 2009.

External links
#blackhistory: In February, 1781, settlers of African, Indian, and Spanish ancestry set out for what will become Los Angeles from Mexico
Impacting Black History: Black People Make Up 8% Of L.A. Population And 34% Of Its Homeless.
https://maps.latimes.com/neighborhoods/ethnicity/black/neighborhood/list/index.html
https://books.google.com/books?id=1c-9yAKqIcYC&printsec=frontcover&dq=african+americans+of+los+angeles&hl=en&newbks=1&newbks_redir=0&source=gb_mobile_search&sa=X&ved=2ahUKEwjJ6qjG7qr7AhWhkokEHVohDdsQ6AF6BAgHEAM

African Americans
African-American cultural history
History of Los Angeles